Bill Terry (1898–1989) was a Major League Baseball player and manager.

Bill Terry may also refer to:

Bill Terry (wrestler) (1942–1999), Canadian professional wrestler
Bill Terry (NASCAR owner), NASCAR car owner from the early 1980s
Bill Terry (author), author of Blue Heaven: Encounters with the Blue Poppy
Bill Terry (ice hockey) (born 1961), ice hockey player

See also
William Terry (disambiguation)